Milano Cadorna is a commuter railway station located near the Castello Sforzesco in Milan, Italy.

History
The original station, built in wood in the style of a chalet, was opened in 1879. This was enlarged in 1920, but the station was destroyed during the bombing raids of the city in the Second World War. The current structure and the homonymous square were completely restored in 1999 under a Gae Aulenti project.

The station is named after the General of the Italian Army Luigi Cadorna.

Transport
Passenger services from this station, by commuter, suburban, regional and express trains, are operated by Trenord.

Local public transportation
Piazzale Cadorna (Cadorna square, in front of the station) is a hub of Milan's public transport: it features Cadorna junction underground station (underground lines M1 and M2) and stops or headlines for one tramway line (1) and eleven bus lines (NM1, NM2, N25, N26, N50, N57, N94, 50, 58, 61 and 94).

Gallery

References

External links

Cadorna
Ferrovienord stations
Railway stations opened in 1879
Milan S Lines stations
1879 establishments in Italy
Railway stations in Italy opened in the 19th century